Luis Fernando Salazar Fernández (born 18 November 1977) is a Mexican politician currently affiliated with the Morena; he previously was a member of the National Action Party. He was a senator of the LXII and LXIII Legislatures of the Mexican Congress and a federal deputy to the LXIV Legislature, each time representing Coahuila.

References

1977 births
Living people
Politicians from Torreón
Members of the Senate of the Republic (Mexico) for Coahuila
Members of the Chamber of Deputies (Mexico) for Coahuila
Morena (political party) politicians
21st-century Mexican politicians
Deputies of the LXIV Legislature of Mexico
Senators of the LXII and LXIII Legislatures of Mexico
Universidad Iberoamericana alumni
George Washington University alumni
Members of the Congress of Coahuila